Department of Industries & Commerce, Haryana is a Ministry and department of the Government of Haryana  in India.

Description
This department came into existence when Haryana was established as a new state within India after being separated from Punjab. Manohar Lal is the chief minister responsible for this department .

See also
Government of Haryana

References

Industries and Commerce
Economy of Haryana
State industries departments of India
Subnational economy ministries